Narabi (also Romanized as Narābī; also known as Narāb, Narāb Bālā, and Narāb-e Bālā) is a village in Halil Rural District, in the Central District of Jiroft County, Kerman Province, Iran. At the 2006 census, its population was 32, in 5 families.

References 

Populated places in Jiroft County